AS Police de Pointe-Noire is a Congolese football club based in Pointe-Noire. 

Football clubs in the Republic of the Congo
Association football clubs established in 1950
Pointe-Noire
1950 establishments in Moyen-Congo
Police association football clubs